= Mullah Nasr al-Din =

1953 film

- Directed by: Iraj Doostdar
- Starring: Iraj Doostdar
- Production company: Honar Film
- Release date: 5 October 1953
- Running time: 100 minutes
- Country: Iran
- Language: Persian

Mullah Nasr al-Din is a 1953 Iranian film directed by and starring Iraj Doostdar.

== Bibliography ==
- Mohammad Ali Issari. Cinema in Iran, 1900-1979. Scarecrow Press, 1989.
